Afgansyah Reza better known by his mononym Afgan (born 27 May 1989) is an Indonesian singer and actor of Minangkabau descent.

Early life and career 
Afgansyah Reza was born on 27 May 1989 in Jakarta and into a Muslim musical family of Minangkabau origin, although he never had any vocal training. He is the second of four children from Loyd Yahya and Lola Purnama. His career began when he and a few friends decided to record a private album at Wanna B Instant Recording Studio. The producers at the studio offered him a contract when they heard him sing. His first album, Confession No.1, was a mix of jazz, pop, and R&B influences and including tracks, such as  "Terima Kasih Cinta", "Klise", "Sadis", and "Tanpa Batas Waktu". He won the Best Solo Male Vocalist Award for the song at the 2009 Anugerah Musik Indonesia. The next year, he also appeared in the film  and performed on the film's soundtrack. His second album, The One, was released in January 2010. In 2011, he performed the theme song at the Southeast Asian Games.

He has since then released 'Live to Love' album in 2013, followed by 'Sides' in 2016 and 'Dekade' in 2018. In November 2018, Afgan celebrated 10 years in the music industry by kicking off his Dekade concert in Kuala Lumpur, Malaysia followed by another concert in Jakarta in September 2019. Both concerts were sold out.

In 2020, Afgan together with Raisa released the single "Tunjukkan" five years after their first collaboration. Afgan had just released a new single on 6 February 2021, called "I'm sorry". His first global album "Wallflower", containing 10 tracks was released on 9 April 2021.

Personal life 
His personal life is closely followed by the Asian media. He has a Bachelor in Economics from Monash University.

Discography

Studio albums

Extended plays

Singles

Awards and nominations

Filmography

Film

Television

References

External links 
 Afgan discography on Discogs
 Afgan discography on iTunes

21st-century Indonesian male singers
Indonesian male voice actors
Indonesian Muslims
Indonesian pop singers
Minangkabau people
1989 births
Male actors from Jakarta
Living people
Singers from Jakarta
Anugerah Musik Indonesia winners
Tenors